Steve Darcis was the defending champion, but Albert Montañés defeated him 1–6, 7–5, 6–3, in the final.

Seeds
The top four seeds receive a bye into the second round.

Draw

Finals

Top half

Bottom half

External links
 Draw
 Qualifying Draw

Singles